Kukuom is a town in the Ahafo Region of Ghana. It's the Capital of Asunafo South District.
Kukuom is known for The Kukuom Agric Secondary School.  The school is a second cycle institution.

References

Populated places in the Ahafo Region